Christoph Nösig (also spelled Noesig; born 19 June 1985) is an Austrian alpine ski racer.

He competed at the 2015 World Championships in Beaver Creek, USA, in the giant slalom, and he was member of the Austrian team that won gold medals in the team event.

References

1985 births
Austrian male alpine skiers
Living people
Sportspeople from Innsbruck